Hans Byberg (born 8 July 1965) is a Swedish bobsledder. He competed in the two man and the four man events at the 1994 Winter Olympics.

References

External links
 

1965 births
Living people
Swedish male bobsledders
Olympic bobsledders of Sweden
Bobsledders at the 1994 Winter Olympics
People from Karlskoga Municipality
Sportspeople from Örebro County
20th-century Swedish people